Lucan Airport  is located  southwest of Lucan, Ontario, Canada. It is owned and operated by General Airspray Ltd.

References

Registered aerodromes in Ontario